The FA National Futsal Series (NFS) is the top tier futsal competition in England. The Competition champions are nominated to The FA to represent England in the UEFA Futsal Champions League.

History 
Following the launch of The FA first ever strategy for futsal "Fast Forward with Futsal" in 2018, The FA developed the National Futsal Series competition to provide an opportunity to continue the transformation of futsal across England. 

The FA National Futsal Series inaugural season was in 2019/2020. The 2019/2020 season started in September and continued to March. The season was not concluded due to the COVID-19 pandemic.

On the 22nd of September 2021 BT announced a new three-year agreement which will see seven weekends of the 2021/22 National Futsal Series Men’s Tier One and Women’s Super Series season shown live on BT Sport.

Competitions

Men
 FA NFS Tier 1
 FA NFS Tier 2 North
 FA NFS Tier 2 South

Women
 Women Super Series Tier 1
 Women Super Series North
 Women Super Series South

Clubs

Men 
{
  "type": "FeatureCollection",
  "features": [
    {
      "type": "Feature",
      "properties": {},
      "geometry": {
        "type": "Point",
        "coordinates": [
          -0.37078857421875,
          50.82155341392255
        ]
      }
    },
    {
      "type": "Feature",
      "properties": {},
      "geometry": {
        "type": "Point",
        "coordinates": [
          0.5486297607421876,
          51.38442375678171
        ]
      }
    },
    {
      "type": "Feature",
      "properties": {},
      "geometry": {
        "type": "Point",
        "coordinates": [
          -0.16882896423339844,
          51.48742264931338
        ]
      }
    },
    {
      "type": "Feature",
      "properties": {},
      "geometry": {
        "type": "Point",
        "coordinates": [
          0.06643295288085939,
          51.508795879381864
        ]
      }
    },
    {
      "type": "Feature",
      "properties": {},
      "geometry": {
        "type": "Point",
        "coordinates": [
          -0.35121917724609375,
          51.67234223461821
        ]
      }
    },
    {
      "type": "Feature",
      "properties": {},
      "geometry": {
        "type": "Point",
        "coordinates": [
          -0.23002624511718753,
          51.76635260726088
        ]
      }
    },
    {
      "type": "Feature",
      "properties": {},
      "geometry": {
        "type": "Point",
        "coordinates": [
          -0.7487869262695314,
          51.62931312868962
        ]
      }
    },
    {
      "type": "Feature",
      "properties": {},
      "geometry": {
        "type": "Point",
        "coordinates": [
          -0.780029296875,
          52.040666043171306
        ]
      }
    },
    {
      "type": "Feature",
      "properties": {},
      "geometry": {
        "type": "Point",
        "coordinates": [
          -0.46623229980468756,
          52.13306655935828
        ]
      }
    },
    {
      "type": "Feature",
      "properties": {},
      "geometry": {
        "type": "Point",
        "coordinates": [
          0.12153625488281251,
          52.20171539256484
        ]
      }
    },
    {
      "type": "Feature",
      "properties": {},
      "geometry": {
        "type": "Point",
        "coordinates": [
          0.7147979736328126,
          51.53950234032649
        ]
      }
    },
    {
      "type": "Feature",
      "properties": {},
      "geometry": {
        "type": "Point",
        "coordinates": [
          -0.9805297851562501,
          51.45058375685898
        ]
      }
    },
    {
      "type": "Feature",
      "properties": {},
      "geometry": {
        "type": "Point",
        "coordinates": [
          -1.7907714843750002,
          51.056933728985435
        ]
      }
    },
    {
      "type": "Feature",
      "properties": {},
      "geometry": {
        "type": "Point",
        "coordinates": [
          -2.2247314453125004,
          52.18403686498285
        ]
      }
    },
    {
      "type": "Feature",
      "properties": {},
      "geometry": {
        "type": "Point",
        "coordinates": [
          -1.9143676757812502,
          52.484452858289536
        ]
      }
    },
    {
      "type": "Feature",
      "properties": {},
      "geometry": {
        "type": "Point",
        "coordinates": [
          -1.2277221679687502,
          52.76289173758374
        ]
      }
    },
    {
      "type": "Feature",
      "properties": {},
      "geometry": {
        "type": "Point",
        "coordinates": [
          -1.4776611328125002,
          52.91552722044141
        ]
      }
    },
    {
      "type": "Feature",
      "properties": {},
      "geometry": {
        "type": "Point",
        "coordinates": [
          -1.1700439453125002,
          52.94367289991597
        ]
      }
    },
    {
      "type": "Feature",
      "properties": {},
      "geometry": {
        "type": "Point",
        "coordinates": [
          -2.2604370117187504,
          53.47170048572763
        ]
      }
    },
    {
      "type": "Feature",
      "properties": {},
      "geometry": {
        "type": "Point",
        "coordinates": [
          -2.4252319335937504,
          53.58272269994398
        ]
      }
    },
    {
      "type": "Feature",
      "properties": {},
      "geometry": {
        "type": "Point",
        "coordinates": [
          -2.8976440429687504,
          53.186287573913305
        ]
      }
    },
    {
      "type": "Feature",
      "properties": {},
      "geometry": {
        "type": "Point",
        "coordinates": [
          -2.9388427734375004,
          54.895564790773385
        ]
      }
    },
    {
      "type": "Feature",
      "properties": {},
      "geometry": {
        "type": "Point",
        "coordinates": [
          -1.39801025390625,
          54.9081985929894
        ]
      }
    },
    {
      "type": "Feature",
      "properties": {},
      "geometry": {
        "type": "Point",
        "coordinates": [
          -1.57928466796875,
          54.76742416272956
        ]
      }
    },
    {
      "type": "Feature",
      "properties": {},
      "geometry": {
        "type": "Point",
        "coordinates": [
          -1.0739135742187502,
          53.960933558166715
        ]
      }
    }
  ]
}

*Previously ProFustal London

Women 
{
  "type": "FeatureCollection",
  "features": [
    {
      "type": "Feature",
      "properties": {},
      "geometry": {
        "type": "Point",
        "coordinates": [
          -2.96630859375,
          53.416080203680465
        ]
      }
    },
    {
      "type": "Feature",
      "properties": {},
      "geometry": {
        "type": "Point",
        "coordinates": [
          -2.2521972656250004,
          53.501117042943186
        ]
      }
    },
    {
      "type": "Feature",
      "properties": {},
      "geometry": {
        "type": "Point",
        "coordinates": [
          -2.9003906250000004,
          53.19122467094173
        ]
      }
    },
    {
      "type": "Feature",
      "properties": {},
      "geometry": {
        "type": "Point",
        "coordinates": [
          -2.9690551757812504,
          53.40134499699228
        ]
      }
    },
    {
      "type": "Feature",
      "properties": {},
      "geometry": {
        "type": "Point",
        "coordinates": [
          -2.92510986328125,
          53.40134499699228
        ]
      }
    },
    {
      "type": "Feature",
      "properties": {},
      "geometry": {
        "type": "Point",
        "coordinates": [
          -2.4307250976562504,
          53.57620003591595
        ]
      }
    },
    {
      "type": "Feature",
      "properties": {},
      "geometry": {
        "type": "Point",
        "coordinates": [
          -1.39801025390625,
          54.906619584490926
        ]
      }
    },
    {
      "type": "Feature",
      "properties": {},
      "geometry": {
        "type": "Point",
        "coordinates": [
          -1.4666748046875002,
          52.923807261265246
        ]
      }
    },
    {
      "type": "Feature",
      "properties": {},
      "geometry": {
        "type": "Point",
        "coordinates": [
          -1.5078735351562502,
          52.40912125231122
        ]
      }
    },
    {
      "type": "Feature",
      "properties": {},
      "geometry": {
        "type": "Point",
        "coordinates": [
          -1.9226074218750002,
          52.47441608702583
        ]
      }
    },
    {
      "type": "Feature",
      "properties": {},
      "geometry": {
        "type": "Point",
        "coordinates": [
          -0.47790527343750006,
          52.13854550670474
        ]
      }
    },
    {
      "type": "Feature",
      "properties": {},
      "geometry": {
        "type": "Point",
        "coordinates": [
          -1.2194824218750002,
          52.77452416702355
        ]
      }
    },
    {
      "type": "Feature",
      "properties": {},
      "geometry": {
        "type": "Point",
        "coordinates": [
          -0.21148681640625003,
          51.78653294239638
        ]
      }
    },
    {
      "type": "Feature",
      "properties": {},
      "geometry": {
        "type": "Point",
        "coordinates": [
          0.0439453125,
          51.50703296721856
        ]
      }
    },
    {
      "type": "Feature",
      "properties": {},
      "geometry": {
        "type": "Point",
        "coordinates": [
          -0.9722900390625001,
          51.44887208400473
        ]
      }
    },
    {
      "type": "Feature",
      "properties": {},
      "geometry": {
        "type": "Point",
        "coordinates": [
          0.019226074218750003,
          51.51045188624859
        ]
      }
    }
  ]
}

Footballs
Nike provided the official ball of the NFS and is used by all teams up until the conclusion of the Summer Showdown in 2021

Since the start of season 21-22 Umbro Balls are being used by the National Futsal Series.

See also
 England national futsal team
 The Football Association

References

External links
 Official website

Futsal competitions in England
2019 establishments in England
Professional sports leagues in the United Kingdom